Gyawali is a surname or family name found in Nepal. It is also written as Gyawali, Gnyawali, Gnawali or Gyanwali; however, Gyawali is the correct spelling based on the letters that is used to form the letter ज्ञ. The surname belongs to a Brahmin/Kshatriya caste in Nepal.

Etymology
Jnawali is historically believed to have an origin from present day Gulmi/Arghakhanchi area. 'Jnawa' is the old endangered name of Baletaksar, Chautara and Bamgha VDC of Gulmi. The word Jnawali was historically derived as the inhabitants of Jnawa Kshetra.

Notable People

Notable people with the name include:

Surya Bikram Gyawali, a Nepali historian
Shova Gyawali, an author and media entrepreneur
Radha Gyawali, Former Minister
Pradeep Gyawali, Nepalese politician
Thakur Prasad Gyawaly, Former Inspector General of Nepal Police
Ram Kumar Gyawali, a Nepalese politician

References

Nepali-language surnames